A Doll's House, Part 2 is a 2017 play written by Lucas Hnath. The play premiered at the South Coast Repertory, in April 2017, before transferring to Broadway at the John Golden Theatre. The play "picks up after Henrik Ibsen's 1879 play A Doll's House concludes".

Productions
The play was commissioned by South Coast Repertory in Costa Mesa, California, where it was directed by Shelley Butler in April 2017. The play opened on Broadway on April 27, 2017, after previews, which began on March 30, 2017, at the John Golden Theatre. The Broadway production was directed by Sam Gold and the cast featured Laurie Metcalf, Chris Cooper, Jayne Houdyshell, and Condola Rashād.  This marked Hnath's Broadway debut.

The Broadway production had been extended to January 7, 2018, past the original 16-week limited engagement closing in July. However, it was announced on September 6, 2017 that the production would close on September 24, 2017.

Metcalf, Cooper, and Rashād exited the production on July 23. They were replaced by Julie White as Nora, Stephen McKinley Henderson as Torvald, and Erin Wilhelmi as Emmy.

The Melbourne Theatre Company is scheduled to present the Australian premiere, featuring Marta Dusseldorp, opening in August 2018.

A production directed by James Macdonald and starring Noma Dumezweni is scheduled to run 10 June 2022 - 6 August 2022 at the Donmar Warehouse.

Overview
The play, set in 1894, concerns Nora, who had left her family and then returns after 15 years. The play examines the "rules of society and gender."

Characters
Nora Helmer
Torvald Helmer
Emmy Helmer, the daughter of Nora and Torvald
Anne Marie, the Helmer family's nanny

Synopsis

The play begins with a knock on the door — the same door that was slammed shut, fifteen years earlier when Nora exited at the end of Ibsen’s play. Nora has returned, and it is she who is knocking. After leaving her husband, children, and the nursemaid, Nora became a successful feminist novelist. The reason for her return is to finalize a divorce from Torvald; she needs him to sign the legal papers. Nora is questioned about what she has been doing, and the family and the nursemaid express their recriminations of her.

Awards and nominations
Laurie Metcalf was nominated for the 2017 Drama Desk Award, Outstanding Actress in a Play, and Jayne Houdyshell was nominated for Outstanding Featured Actress in a Play.

The play was nominated for the 2017 Outer Critics Circle Awards: Outstanding New Broadway Play, Outstanding Actress in a Play (Laurie Metcalf) and Outstanding Featured Actress in a Play (Jayne Houdyshell).

The play received eight 2017 Tony Award nominations: Best Play, Best Performance by an Actor in a Leading Role in a Play (Chris Cooper), Best Performance by an Actress in a Leading Role in a Play (Laurie Metcalf), Best Performance by an Actress in a Featured Role in a Play (Jayne Houdyshell and Condola Rashād), Best Direction of a Play (Sam Gold) and Best Costume Design of a Play (David Zinn). 

Metcalf won the 2017 Tony Award for Best Performance by an Actress in a Leading Role in a Play.

References

External links
 

2017 plays
American plays
Adaptations of works by Henrik Ibsen
Fiction set in 1894
Plays set in the 19th century